Harmony David Samuels (born 16 May 1980), also known as H-Money, is an English record producer, multi-instrumentalist and songwriter. He has produced a multitude of hits for artists such as Brandy, Jennifer Lopez, Mary J. Blige, Ariana Grande, Fifth Harmony, Chip, Ciara, Fantasia, Janet Jackson, Chris Brown, Keyshia Cole, Ne-Yo and more.

Background
Harmony Samuels was born 16 May 1980 in Tottenham, London to Nigerian parents.  When he was 4 he taught himself how to play the piano and bass while playing for his church. He had become his church's musical director at the age of 12. 
It was at the age of 14 that he decided to become a music producer.

Music career
Samuels' production career began in the UK, where he worked with some of the most relevant artists in the music scene including Chipmunk, Alesha Dixon, and Craig David. He then moved to Los Angeles after he caught the attention of producer Rodney Jerkins. After transitioning to L.A. he continued to build on his career by working with artists such as Maroon 5, Chris Brown, Mary J. Blige, Brandy Norwood, Kelly Rowland, Jennifer Hudson, Ne-Yo, Keyshia Cole and others.

In 2007, Samuels was on his last leg with the music industry, he had thought to himself to retire, and go back to his old school and become a music teacher when he was discovered by Rodney Jerkins. Rodney Jerkins gave him a producer deal and a publishing deal. 
Harmony eventually moved to LA in 2009. In 2011, he opened his own recording studio, London Bridge Studios, in Los Angeles.
In 2013, he produced Ariana Grande's debut hit single "The Way" as well as several songs from her debut album, Yours Truly and "My Everything". He also contributed 13 out of 14 songs on Fantasia's album Side Effects of You.

Between grooming rising stars with his knowledge of the music industry, and educating students and professionals alike with his mentoring and experience, Harmony debuted his first act signed to BOE in 2016, MAJOR. Two years later, over 70 million views on YouTube, "Why I Love you has gone GOLD, BOE's first Certified Gold record.

He currently resides in Los Angeles, where he runs B.O.E. Global.

Discography

References

External links

BOE TV: BOE TV Presents

1980 births
Living people
English people of Nigerian descent
English record producers
English rhythm and blues musicians
English male singer-songwriters
English expatriates in the United States
Musicians from London
People from Tottenham
21st-century English singers
21st-century British male singers